The 2004 South Asian Games, officially known as the IX South Asian Federation Games, were held in Islamabad, Pakistan from 29 March to 7 April 2004. Originally scheduled for 2001, the games were postponed in the wake of the 9/11 attacks on the United States in which the US later declared Pakistan a major non-NATO ally. The slogan for the Games was Rising Above. For the first time, Afghanistan participated in the games.

Postponements
The games in Islamabad were originally to be held from 6 to 15 October 2001, but they were inevitably rescheduled (with the location remaining unchanged) for 30 March 2002 due to the invasion of Afghanistan. They were postponed again due to tensions between Pakistan and India. They were the set to be held from 29 March to 6 April 2003. Afghanistan was invited for the games, however Bhutan and India withdrew.

The entire event was postponed for the third time due to the war against Iraq. Pakistan retained the organisational authority, despite Sri Lanka being offered to host the games for 2004. Nevertheless, the honour was returned to Sri Lanka as they were given the 10th edition for 2006 instead. The 9th edition was then rescheduled in Pakistan, for 29 March through 7 April 2004. Despite not entering in the previous schedule, Bhutan and India now entered, though the Maldives withdrew from the football tournament.

The Games

Participating nations 
The following eight countries competed.

Sports 
  Athletics 
  Badminton 
  Boxing 
  Football
  Kabaddi 
  Judo
  Rowing (debut)
  Shooting
  Squash
  Swimming
  Table tennis
  Taekwondo
  Volleyball
  Weightlifting
  Wrestling

Medal tally

See also 

 South Asian Games celebrated in Pakistan
 1989 South Asian Games – Islamabad
 2004 South Asian Games – Islamabad
 2023 South Asian Games – Lahore
 South Asian Games

References

 
South Asian Games
South Asian Games
South Asian Games
South Asian Games
South Asian Games
South Asian Games
South Asian Games, 2004
South Asian Games, 2004
Multi-sport events in Pakistan